Ferdinand Gehr (1896–1996) was a Swiss painter.

References
This article was initially translated from the German Wikipedia.

20th-century Swiss painters
Swiss male painters
1896 births
1996 deaths
Swiss centenarians
Men centenarians
20th-century Swiss male artists